Alyas Pogi: Birador ng Nueva Ecija is a 1990 Filipino action film directed by Joey Del Rosario. It stars Bong Revilla as the titular character. The film is the first installment of the Alyas Pogi film series.

The film is streaming online on YouTube.

Cast

Ramon "Bong" Revilla Jr. as Pat. Henry "Alyas Pogi" S. Cruz
Janice De Belen as Estela Mallari-Cruz
Edu Manzano as Agapito Rodrigo
Johnny Delgado as Hepe Banson
Tommy Abuel as Erning
Bernard Bonnin as Don Pepe Rodrigo
Baldo Marro as Banjo
George Estregan, Jr. as Emilio Mallari
Robert Talabis as Pablo Mallari
Rez Cortez as Alex
Bomber Moran as Cardong Kalabaw
Edwin Reyes as Erik Rodrigo
Roldan Aquino as Big Boy
Gary "Boy" Garcia, Jr. as Dante
Christopher Paloma as Atong
Ruben Rustia as Padre Jose
Lito Anzures as Mang Lucio
Lucita Soriano as Aling Senyang
Renato del Prado as Guido
Ernie Ortega as Mr. Ching
Ernie David as David
Vic Belaro as Victor
Polly Cadsawan as Poldo
James Raymundo as Jam Jam

Production
As late as November 3, 1990, the film had the title Pat. Henry Cruz: Alias Pogi before it was changed to Alyas Pogi: Birador ng Nueva Ecija.

References

External links

Full Movie on Solar Pictures

1990 films
1990 action films
Filipino-language films
Philippine action films
Moviestars Production films
Films directed by Joey del Rosario